Four Sons is a 1940 war film directed by Archie Mayo. It stars Don Ameche and Eugenie Leontovich. It is a remake of the 1928 film of the same name.

The film follows the lives of four Czecho-German brothers following the German occupation of Czechoslovakia. Two of them choose to serve Nazi Germany, another chooses to fight in support of the Czech lands, and the fourth emigrates to the United States.

Plot

When the Germans invade Czechoslovakia in 1939, the four sons of a Czecho-German family follow different paths: Czech patriot, Nazi supporter, artist in America, and heroic German soldier.

Cast
 Don Ameche as Chris Bern
 Eugenie Leontovich as Frau Bern
 Mary Beth Hughes as Anna
 Alan Curtis as Karl Bern
 George Ernest as Fritz Bern
 Robert Lowery as Joseph
 Lionel Royce as Max Sturm
 Sig Ruman as Newmann (as Sig Rumann)
 Ludwig Stössel as Pastor
 Christian Rub as Kapek
 Torben Meyer as Gustav

References

External links
 
 

1940 films
1940 war films
Remakes of American films
American war films
American black-and-white films
Films about Nazi Germany
Films directed by Archie Mayo
Films set in 1939
Films set in the Czech Republic
Films set in Czechoslovakia
20th Century Fox films
Sound film remakes of silent films
American World War II films
World War II films made in wartime
1940s English-language films